Dominik Kisiel (born 15 April 1990) is a Polish professional footballer who plays as a goalkeeper for VfB Oldenburg.

Career
Born in Bełchatów, Kisiel debuted in the Ekstraklasa with local side GKS Bełchatów on 23 February 2008.

In the summer 2018, Kisiel re-joined VfL Oldenburg.

References

External links
 
 

1990 births
Living people
Sportspeople from Bełchatów
Sportspeople from Łódź Voivodeship
Association football goalkeepers
Polish footballers
Poland youth international footballers
GKS Bełchatów players
GKS Tychy players
Berliner AK 07 players
Hallescher FC players
VfL Oldenburg players
FC Viktoria 1889 Berlin players
3. Liga players
Regionalliga players
Polish expatriate footballers
Expatriate footballers in Germany
Polish expatriate sportspeople in Germany